Kenneth Widemann Karlsen (born 29 June 1973) is a retired Norwegian footballer and football executive.

He made his debut for Strømsgodset in 1992 and retired in late summer 2006. His only time away from Strømsgodset was a 2000 loan at Widzew Łódź in what was the Norwegian post-season. Near the very end of the 2006 season he came out of retirement to help Mjøndalen IF climb the league tier, making his debut in an 11–0 thrashing of Hønefoss SK and securing a playoff to the 2. divisjon, which they won.

Karlsen continued featuring for Mjøndalen until 2010, also making a brief comeback for fifth-tier Åssiden IF in 2013. Karlsen worked in Buskerud District of Football, but became more tied to Mjøndalen in 2009 as playing assistant manager. From 2010 he was hired as their managing director. His time was crowned with promotion to the 2015 Eliteserien as well as promotion and survival of the 2019 Eliteserien.

References

1973 births
Living people
Sportspeople from Drammen
Norwegian footballers
Strømsgodset Toppfotball players
Mjøndalen IF players
Eliteserien players
Norwegian First Division players
Widzew Łódź players
Ekstraklasa players
Norwegian expatriate footballers
Expatriate footballers in Poland
Norwegian expatriate sportspeople in Poland
Norwegian sports executives and administrators
Association football defenders
Mjøndalen IF non-playing staff